Mohammad Ali Hasan al-Na'im (also translit: al-Na'em) was a 27-year-old Palestinian militant from Gaza who was killed by Israeli soldiers near the Israel–Gaza fence in an agricultural field east of Abasan al-Saghira at around 5:40 am on February 23, 2020. The killing gained notoriety because of footage of an Israeli army bulldozer mutilating and dismembering the body as it tried to snatch it.

The incident 

According to Israeli sources, two Palestinian men approached the fence east of Khan Younis with the intention of placing an improvised explosive device near it. Israeli troops observing them fired three artillery shells and opened fire, killing al-Na'im and wounding his accomplice. According to Palestinian sources, al-Na'im was killed 100 to 200 meters from the fence.

Palestinians nearby, acting as first responders, made several attempts to evacuate the body but were driven back by Israeli fire.

Eventually, an armored bulldozer protected by a Merkava tank was sent through a gate in the fence to snatch al-Na'im's body. At the same time, three Palestinians, Muhammad Khaled Al-Najjar, 19, Ahmad Samir Al-Najjar, 20, and Mu'taz HassanAl-Najjar, 21, made another attempt to evacuate the body but the bulldozer sped towards them and they were fired on by the soldiers. Muhammad and Mu'taz were shot in their legs and they had to abandon their evacuation attempt. According to Mu'taz affidavit the trio signaled to the soldiers that they were civilians:

The bulldozer ran over the corpse then scooped it up with its plow and swung it in the air before carrying it to the Israeli side of the border. According to al-Najjar, a journalist based in Gaza, who filmed the incident: "The bulldozer made several failed attempts to violently snatch his body with its blade only, until it mutilated the body and dismembered parts of it." and "People managed to retrieve parts of his legs, which the family buried." According to Alaa Qdeih's witness affidavit, cited by Al Mezan, the bulldozer remained for three minutes and the tank for 20 after which he and others collected remaining body parts:

Al-Na'im was identified as a member of the Al-Quds Brigades, the military wing of the Islamic Jihad. He was survived by his wife Hiba, his son Hamza and his mother Mirvat.

Responses 

Al-Najjar's and others footage showing the body dangling from the Israeli army bulldozers blade spread on social media and caused and outrage in Gaza. Islamic Jihad fired rockets and Israel responded with several airstrikes on Gaza and Syria, injuring four Palestinians and killing two members of the Al-Quds brigades in Damascus; Ziad Ahmad Mansour, 23 and Salim Ahmad Salim, 24.

Hamas spokesperson Fawzi Barhoum said in a statement: "The Zionist occupation’s deliberate killing of an innocent young man along the perimeter of the Gaza Strip and its maltreatment of his corpse in plain sight is another heinous crime that has been added to its record of awful crimes at the expense of our Palestinian people" and promised retaliation.

Israel's Defense Minister Naftali Bennett praised the military's handling of the incident, tweeting "I give my backing to the IDF that eliminated the terrorists and collected the body. That is what is needed and that is how we will act." He argued that bodies of Palestinians should be used as bargaining chip to negotiate the return of the bodies of Oron Shaul and Hadar Goldin, two Israeli soldiers killed by Hamas during the 2014 Gaza war. Aida Touma-Sliman a Palestinian Member of Knesset (MK) of the Joint List called Bennett "the minister of death and brutality". Ofer Cassif a Jewish MK of the same party called the abduction of the body an "nauseating, blood-thirsty act of vampirism." According to Al Mezan, Israel has withheld the bodies of 58 Palestinians since April 2016.

Adalah, the Legal Center for Arab Minority Rights in Israel, stated that "actions depicted in the video [are] war crimes and blatant violations of international criminal law, and international human rights and humanitarian law" and demanded that the military would open a criminal investigation.

On March 2, 2020, Al Mezan and several other human rights organizations involved in the Israeli–Palestinian conflict sent a joint letter to the United Nations special rapporteur on the desecration of al-Na'im's body and on the injury of the youths trying to evacuate it.

Al-Na'im's mother Mirvat demanded that Israel would return the body of her son.

See also 
 List of violent incidents in the Israeli–Palestinian conflict, 2020
 List of Palestinian rocket attacks on Israel in 2020

References

External links 

 Outrage as Israeli forces kill Palestinian, use bulldozer to seize his body, Feb 24, 2020. TRT World. YouTube.
 Israeli bulldozer drags body of Palestinian man, Feb 23, 2020. Middle East Eye. YouTube.
 Butchered with a bulldozer, March 17, 2020. Hamza Abu Eltarabesh. The Electronic Intifada.
 This Week's Palestinian Sacrifice, Delivered by an Israeli Bulldozer, February 27, 2020. Gideon Levy. Haaretz

2020 in the State of Palestine
Extrajudicial killings
Israeli–Palestinian conflict
February 2020 events in Asia
People killed by Israeli security forces